Surrey-Newton is a provincial electoral district for the Legislative Assembly of British Columbia, Canada.

The riding was first created out of the two-member Surrey district in 1986, which had been in existence since 1966. Surrey had always been a battleground between the NDP and Social Credit, trading back and forth between the two parties. The riding was represented by Premier Rita Johnston, who was a prominent Cabinet minister in the Vander Zalm government between 1986 and 1991.

In 1991, Penny Priddy defeated Johnston in a realigning election that saw Social Credit experience massive defeats all across the province. During the NDP government from 1991 to 2001, Priddy emerged as a prominent Cabinet minister in portfolios such as Women's Equality, Tourism and Culture, Health, Labour and Children and Families.

Although the riding was won by the Liberals during their 2001 landslide victory, it has been a relatively safe NDP seat since the 2005 election. The riding is home to a large South Asian community, whose population has exploded in Surrey since the early 1990s. The shift towards the NDP can largely be attributed to the party's inroads in the Indo-Canadian community.

Demographics

Geography

1999 Redistribution
Surrey-Newton has its entire southern half removed.

History

Member of Legislative Assembly 
Its MLA is Harry Bains. He was first elected in 2005, and was re-elected in 2009 and 2013. He represents the New Democratic Party of British Columbia.

Election results 

|-

|-
 
|NDP
|Param Grewal
|align="right"|3,949
|align="right"|28.93%
|align="right"|
|align="right"|$32,318

|}

|-
 
|NDP
|Penny Priddy
|align="right"|13,969
|align="right"|49.54%
|align="right"|
|align="right"|$42,833

|-

|Natural Law
|Shane Laporte
|align="right"|48
|align="right"|0.17%
|align="right"|
|align="right"|$118

|}

|-
 
|NDP
|Penny Priddy
|align="right"|10,193
|align="right"|42.28%
|align="right"|
|align="right"|$47,584
|-

|}

References

External links 
BC Stats - 2001
Results of 2001 election (pdf)
2001 Expenditures
Results of 1996 election
1996 Expenditures
Results of 1991 election
1991 Expenditures
Website of the Legislative Assembly of British Columbia

British Columbia provincial electoral districts
Politics of Surrey, British Columbia
Provincial electoral districts in Greater Vancouver and the Fraser Valley